The 2022–23 Hartford Hawks men's basketball team represented the University of Hartford in the 2022–23 NCAA Division I men's basketball season. The Hawks, who were originally supposed to be led by 13th-year head coach John Gallagher until his sudden resignation one night before the season's first game, played their home games at Chase Arena in West Hartford, Connecticut and competed as an independent.

Assistant coach Tom Devitt was appointed the interim head coach for 2022–23.

The 2022-23 season marked the Hawks' final year as a D-I team, and will transition to the D-III Commonwealth Coast Conference in July 2023.

Previous season
The Hawks finished the 2021–22 season 12–20, 9–9 in America East play to finish in a tie for fifth place. As the No. 4 seed, they defeated No. 5 seed Albany in the quarterfinals of the America East tournament, before falling to No. 2 seed UMBC in the semifinals. This was their last season as a member of the America East Conference, as they will be playing their final D-I season as an independent, as they will transition to the D-III Commonwealth Coast Conference in July 2023.

Roster

Schedule and results

|-
!colspan=12 style=| Regular season

Sources

References

Hartford Hawks men's basketball seasons
Hartford
Hartford
Hartford